This article represents all other appearances that Emmylou Harris has contributed to.

Solo contributions

 Won the Golden Globe Award for Best Original Song.

Collaborations A–F 
See Emmylou Harris collaborations A–F

Collaborations G–K
See Emmylou Harris collaborations G–K

Collaborations L–Q
See Emmylou Harris collaborations L–Q

Collaborations R–Z
See Emmylou Harris collaborations R–Z

References

Country music discographies
Lists of songs
 Emmylou Harris appearances
 Emmylou Harris appearances

Folk music discographies